Robert Lee Allen (born May 29, 1942) is an American activist, writer, and Adjunct Professor of African-American Studies and Ethnic Studies at the University of California, Berkeley. Allen received his Ph.D. in Sociology from the University of California, San Francisco, and previously taught at San José State University and Mills College.  He was Senior Editor (with Editor-in-Chief and Publisher Robert Chrisman) of The Black Scholar: Journal of Black Studies and Research, published quarterly or more frequently in Oakland, California, by the Black World Foundation since 1969.

Allen married Pam Allen in 1965.

In the 1980s he co-founded with Alice Walker the publishing company called Wild Trees Press, publishing the work of Third World writers.

Works 
 Black Awakening in Capitalist America: An Analytic History (1969)
 A Guide to Black Power in America: An Historical Analysis (1970)
 Reluctant Reformers: The Impact of Racism on Social Movement in the U.S. (1983)
 Brotherman: The Odyssey of Black Men in America (co-edited with Herb Boyd, reprinted 1996)
 Strong in the Struggle: My Life as a Black Labor Activist (with ILWU militant Lee Brown, 2001)
 Honoring Sergeant Carter: A Family's Journey to Uncover the Truth About an American Hero (with Allene G. Carter, 2004)
 The Port Chicago Mutiny: The Story of the Largest Mass Mutiny Trial in U.S. Naval History (Heyday Books, 1989, republished 2006).

Awards 
 Guggenheim Fellowship (1977)
 American Book Award (1995, with Herb Boyd) for Brotherman: The Odyssey of Black Men in America
 The Joseph Small Legacy Award (1998) of the Black Hollywood Education and Research Center.  The award honors Port Chicago disaster survivor Joseph R. Small, Jr., a member of The Port Chicago 50 who provided the narrative for the first chapter of The Port Chicago Mutiny.
 One of 12 honorees of the San Francisco Public Library's Long Walk to Freedom living-history exhibition (2003)

See also
 Lián Amaris
Stephan Aarstol

References 

1942 births
African-American writers
American magazine editors
Living people
American Book Award winners
University of California, San Francisco alumni
21st-century African-American people
20th-century African-American people